Streptomyces cerasinus is a bacterium species from the genus of Streptomyces which has been isolated from soil from Thailand.

See also 
 List of Streptomyces species

References

External links
Type strain of Streptomyces cerasinus at BacDive -  the Bacterial Diversity Metadatabase

cerasinus
Bacteria described in 2017